"The Lucky One", also known as "The Lucky One (Like a Wild Bird of Prey)", is a song by American singer Laura Branigan from her third studio album, Self Control (1984). It was released on July 2, 1984, as the album's second single. The song peaked at number 20 on the Billboard Hot 100, becoming Branigan's fifth top-20 entry.

Branigan's performance of "The Lucky One" won the Grand Prix award at the Tokyo Music Festival held April 1, 1984; the prize was three million yen ($13,400).

The song was used as the theme for the 1983 television film An Uncommon Love. In 2000, Australian-born Irish singer Johnny Logan released a cover version as the third and final single from his album Love Is All (1999).

Music video
The music video for "The Lucky One" was directed by Michael Heldman and filmed in Montecito, California. The video depicts Branigan as a gas station attendant who dreams she is brought to a lavish country manor, where she receives instruction in how to display a polished deportment.

Track listings

Charts

References

1984 singles
1984 songs
2000 singles
Atlantic Records singles
Johnny Logan (singer) songs
Laura Branigan songs
Songs written by Bruce Roberts (singer)